The Type 100 Te-Re was an artillery observation vehicle of the Imperial Japanese Army used to spot and recon for SPGs and stationary artillery.  Based on the chassis of the Type 97 Te-Ke tankette, production of the vehicle began in 1940. The Type 100 Te-Re was able to accommodate a crew of six to eight men, while designed to carry observation and radio equipment. A total of 100 to 150 units were produced. They were mainly used in the Second Sino-Japanese War.

Operation
The rear compartment was for the spotters and radio operator. Instead of being used for storing cargo or troops, this rear compartment was fitted with a large radio, observation equipment and a cable reel.  Using this equipment, the spotters would find and relay targets to artillery positions.  They would act as observers for the artillery fire and give firing corrections for targets, as needed.

References

World War II armoured fighting vehicles of Japan
Toyota Group
Military vehicles introduced from 1940 to 1944